Scooter was a Belgian pop band from Antwerp, that started in 1979 as Scooter on the Road.  In 1981, they released the singles "Tattoo Turkey" and "Peppermint Girl".  Due to guitarist Jan Fraeyman suffering from terminal illness he was replaced by Bert Decorte (from The Misters).  Sadly, shortly after the release of their debut album One by One (1981), guitarist Jan Fraeyman died.

Scooter scored a megahit in Belgium with "You (Don't Want to Be Number One)" and won the Summerhit of 1981 award, an annual prize awarded by the Flemish broadcaster Radio 2.

The album “One by One” was produced by the drummer of the band, Herwig Duchateau, who was later successful as the producer of bands like The Bet, Schmutz, Won Ton Ton, The Machines, e.a.).

Scooter, now with guitarist Jan Verheyen after Bert Decorte left the band, released two more albums: Charm and Oblivion with American-sounding songs such as "Will I Ever Recover from You" (1982), "Stand Out" (1982) and "Minute by minute" (1983). In 1982, shortly after the release of Charm, keyboard player Pit Verlinde left the band.

Members
Piet Van Den Heuvel - vocals
Jan Verheyen - guitar
Pit Verlinde - keyboards
Herwig Duchateau - drums

Past members
Jan Fraeyman - guitar
Bert Decorte - guitar

Discography

Albums
Studio albums
 One by One (Ariola, 1981)
 Charm (Ariola, 1982)
 Oblivion (Ariola, 1983)

Compilation albums
 Scooter Master Serie (Polydor, 1997)

Singles
 "Tattoo Turkey" (1981)
 "Peppermint Girl" (1981)
 "You" (1981)
 "Will I Ever Recover From You" (1982)
 "Stand Out" (1982)
 "Minute by Minute" (1983)

External links
 Het Belgisch poparchief

Belgian rock music groups
Belgian pop music groups